Tatiana Diana Carrier (January 27, 1983 - August 12, 2020) was an Armenian American television host, producer and entrepreneur. She was most known for being the founder and CEO of TDC Media, which produced 'Behind the Influence' a popular podcast on iHeartRadio and a creative content and production arm. She was also known for being host and producer for PMC and as the original host and producer of Clevver Movies YouTube channel, peaking over 50 million months views, and currently has over 1 million subscribers. She hosted the 2013 Young Hollywood Awards Red Carpet and most recently being a featured guest on shows including The Daily Share on CNN and Big Morning Buzz.

Tatiana graduated from Barry University with a degree in Broadcast Journalism, and was a field correspondent for FOX Miami's entertainment show, Deco Drive. From Miami she moved to Young Hollywood fulfilling rolls as Host, Writer, and Producer. She worked for Young Hollywood where she headed the daily creation of content for the site as well as Hosting and Producing branded series segments for companies like Vitamin Water, TurboTax, and T-Mobile.

Tatiana then moved on to Clevver Movies, part of the Clevver Media brand and now owned by Defy Media. She became quite well known on Clevver Movies, producing titles such as Fanboy Faceoff and ClevverU. She moved on in 2013 to continue her producing career as well as contracting with Penske Media Corporation to create and host content for Variety and Deadline Hollywood.

Filmography

Television

Online media

References

External links

Living people
Armenian American
American television hosts
American women television presenters
1983 births